Qanbari (also Romanized as Qanbarī; also known as Ghanbari) is a village in Kuhenjan Rural District, Kuhenjan District, Sarvestan County, Fars Province, Iran. At the 2006 census, its population was 241, in 55 families.

References 

Populated places in Sarvestan County